In dentistry, an abutment is a connecting element. This is used in the context of a fixed bridge (the "abutment teeth" referring to the teeth supporting the bridge), partial removable dentures (the "abutment teeth" referring to the teeth supporting the partial) and in implants (used to attach a crown, bridge, or removable denture to the dental implant fixture). The implant fixture is the screw-like component that is osseointegrated.

Bridge abutments

Dental bridge abutments are made such that the path of insertion of the teeth involved is nearly parallel with each other.

Partial denture abutments
Partial denture abutments are unique in that they may incorporate elements such as rest seats, guide planes, and recontouring.

Implant abutments
These are usually called prosthetic implant abutments and are responsible for making the connection between the prosthesis and the implant. These abutments can be made from a variety of materials, such as titanium, surgical stainless steel, gold and zirconia.

The adjacent images show how a ceramic abutment can enhance a ceramic crown by giving it a more lifelike appearance. Ceramic abutments have to be used with care, however, since their compressive strength is nowhere near that of titanium, gold or other noble metals. Most clinicians feel more comfortable using a metal prosthetic abutment in the posterior molar areas, due to the increased masticatory forces present in these areas.

An abutment is not necessarily parallel to the long axis of the implant. It is utilized when the implant is at a different inclination in relation to the proposed prosthesis. Most crowns and fixed partial dentures have a cemented or screw-retained fixation on the abutment.

Three piece implant

In a three piece implant the abutment is fixed on the implant with a screw butt joint. This screw needs to be tightened to a predetermined torque with a dental torque wrench, in order to avoid screw loosening during chewing, which can often create a counter-clockwise torque on the implant-abutment interface, encouraging the abutment screw to come loose. This can largely be prevented with proper screw design and torquing of the abutment.

Two piece implant
In a two piece implant the abutment is morse tapered or cold welded on the implant. Microbial leakage and colonization between the implant and the abutments can result in inflammatory reactions and crestal bone loss. Morse taper conical abutments showed a cumulative implant survival rate of 98.23% in terms of seal performance, microgap formation, torque maintenance, and abutment stability.

One piece implant
A one piece implant (OPI) incorporates the trans-mucosal abutment as an integral part of the implant. This type of implant is often used with a flapless procedure and immediate loading (the crown is placed in a short time after placing the implant).

References

External links
Dental Implant Options

Dentistry